Carlos Gustavo Romero Bonifaz (born 23 August 1966) is a Bolivian lawyer and politician who served as minister of government from 2012 to 2014 and from 2015 to 2019. A member of the Movement for Socialism, Romero previously served as minister of the presidency from 2011 to 2012, as minister of autonomies from 2009 to 2011, and as minister of rural development from 2008 to 2009. In 2014, he was elected Senator for Santa Cruz, a position he held briefly between January and May 2015.

References

External links
 Interview with Carlos Gustavo Romero Bonifaz, October 27, 2006.

1966 births
Living people
21st-century Bolivian lawyers
21st-century Bolivian politicians
Agriculture ministers of Bolivia
20th-century Bolivian lawyers
Bolivian senators from Santa Cruz
Government ministers of Bolivia
Evo Morales administration cabinet members
Members of the Senate of Bolivia
Interior ministers of Bolivia
Movement for Socialism (Bolivia) politicians
People from La Paz
Presidency ministers of Bolivia